UP Yoddhas is a kabbadi franchise of Pro Kabaddi League based in Lucknow, Uttar Pradesh. It is owned by GMR Group. It was found in 2017. In season 8 franchise bought Pardeep Narwal for a record price of 1.65 Cr. 

The Yoddhas play their home matches at Babu Banarasi Das Indoor Stadium, Lucknow. The team made it to the playoffs in every season since its inception in 2017.

Current squad

Head coach record

Seasons

Season V

Season VI

Season VII

Season VIII

Season IX

Records

Overall results Pro Kabbaddi season

By opposition
''Note: Table lists in alphabetical order.

Sponsors

References

Pro Kabaddi League teams
Sports clubs established in 2017
2017 establishments in Uttar Pradesh
Sport in Noida
GMR Group